This is a list of the governors of the province of Kandahar, Afghanistan.

See also
 List of current provincial governors in Afghanistan

References

Kandahar